Philippe Sandler (born 10 February 1997) is a Dutch professional footballer who plays as a centre-back for NEC Nijmegen.

Club career
Born in Amsterdam, Sandler began his senior career with PEC Zwolle in the 2016–17 season, having previously played youth football for Ajax.

In January 2018 it was announced that Sandler would leave PEC Zwolle to join English club Manchester City in the summer of 2018, for a transfer fee reported to be between €2.5 and 3 million. The transfer went through on 31 July 2018. Sandler requested the number 34 shirt in tribute to former Ajax teammate Abdelhak Nouri, who collapsed and suffered brain damage, ending his career.

Sandler made his City debut on 6 January 2019, coming on as a substitute in a 7–0 win over Rotherham United in the FA Cup.

Sandler was loaned to Anderlecht for the 2019–20 season, joining up with Anderlecht player-manager, former City teammate Vincent Kompany.

In the 2020–21 season, Sandler underwent surgery for an ankle injury which left him out of the City first team squad for almost the entire season. He was however able to play in some of the final Academy team games of the season.

On 31 August 2021 he moved on loan to French club Troyes. After two appearances, the loan was ended on 25 January 2022.

He signed for Feyenoord on 1 February 2022, signing a contract until the end of the season with the option to extend for another year. He made his debut for the club on 8 May in a 2–2 draw against PSV. On 27 May 2022, Feyenoord confirmed that the club would not be using the option to extend his contract for another year.

On 11 August 2022, Sandler signed a three-year contract with NEC Nijmegen. He scored his first goal in the Eredivisie on 23 October, deep into overtime to secure a 3–3 home draw against Go Ahead Eagles.

International career
Sandler has represented the Netherlands at under-20 level. He is eligible to play for the Netherlands, South Africa, and United States having been born in Amsterdam to a South African father and American mother.

Personal life
Sandler's father is Jewish.

Career statistics

Honours
Feyenoord
 UEFA Europa Conference League runner-up: 2021–22

References

Living people
1997 births
Footballers from Amsterdam
Dutch people of American descent
Dutch people of South African descent
Dutch people of Jewish descent
Dutch footballers
Netherlands youth international footballers
AFC Ajax players
PEC Zwolle players
Manchester City F.C. players
R.S.C. Anderlecht players
ES Troyes AC players
Feyenoord players
NEC Nijmegen players
Eredivisie players
Belgian Pro League players
Ligue 1 players
Association football defenders
Dutch expatriate footballers
Dutch expatriate sportspeople in England
Expatriate footballers in England
Dutch expatriate sportspeople in Belgium
Expatriate footballers in Belgium
Dutch expatriate sportspeople in France
Expatriate footballers in France